Kyenele  Miyak is a Yuat language of Papua New Guinea.

Versions of its name include Keñele, Keyele, Kenying, Bulang, Kenen Birang, Kyenying-Barang.

It is spoken in Giling (Girin), a village located on the banks of the Yuat River in Yuat Rural LLG, East Sepik Province.

References

Yuat languages
Languages of East Sepik Province